The Jewish Star is a free weekly newspaper that covers the Orthodox Jewish communities in Nassau County, New York and New York City. Its offices are in Garden City, New York.

The Jewish Star began publication in 2002 led by founding Publisher and Editor Jody Bodner Dubow. It is owned by Richner Communications Inc., the parent company of Nassau County’s Herald Community Newspapers, Long Island Xpress chain of shopper publications, and The Riverdale Press in the Bronx.

In 2006, the newspaper became predominantly Orthodox, responding to the demographics of the Five Towns, its primary readership base. In January 2009, the broadsheet format became tabloid.

Ed Weintrob, formerly publisher of The Brooklyn (NY) Paper, became Publisher in May 2013, and later Publisher and Editor; Malka Eisenberg was a former Editor. Former Publishers include Karen C. Green (2011–13), Rabbi David Nasenoff (2011) and  Mayer Fertig (2006-2010). The paper's weekly contributors include Alan Jay Gerber (Bookworm), Rabbi Avi Billet (Parsha of the Week), Rabbi Binny Freedman (From the Heart of Jerusalem), Rabbi Simcha Weinstein (Hippest Rabbi), Jeff Dunetz (Politics to Go), Judy Joszef (Who's in the Kitchen) and Joni Schochett (Kosher Kitchen). Formerly, Rabbi Noam Himstein wrote a column in Hebrew.

References

External links
 The Jewish Star website

Newspapers published in New York (state)
Jewish newspapers published in the United States
Weekly newspapers published in the United States
Jews and Judaism in Nassau County, New York
Jews and Judaism in Queens, New York
Newspapers established in 2002
2002 establishments in New York (state)